In music and in music theory, "seventh interval" refers to the following musical intervals:
 major seventh,
 minor seventh,
 augmented seventh, or
 diminished seventh.

It also refers to inverted second intervals.